The Individuals with Disabilities Education Act is United States federal law enacted in 1990 that governs how states and public agencies provide early intervention, special education, and related services to children with disabilities.  In the state of Hawaii, along with similar state-level legislation, it has been implemented in an Early Intervention program for qualifying children.

Early Intervention: for Children Under the Age 3
Early Intervention is a federal and state-mandated program that provides services to support the development of infant and toddlers from birth to three years of age.  In Hawaii, Early Intervention is managed by the Department of Health.

After Age Three
Under current regulations, Early Intervention services cease when a child turns 3 years old.  Instead, Early Intervention children are required on their 3rd birthday to attend a Special Education Preschool that is run by the Hawaii Department of Education.

The Individuals with Disabilities Education Act (IDEA) allows States to extend Early Intervention services to eligible children who are between 3 and 5 years of age. This option maximizes parental choice, as it allows each parent to decide which option best meets the educational needs of their disabled child.

The State of Hawaii is considering legislation that would extend Early Intervention services to eligible children who are between 3 and 5 years of age. In 2007, those bills are House Bill 531 and Senate Bill 1176.

Legislation Related to Early Intervention in Hawaii
2007 Session

House of Representatives: House Bill 531     amends early intervention services law to be consistent with the reauthorized Individuals with Disabilities Education Improvement Act of 2004.
Senate: Senate Bill 1176 amends early intervention services law to be consistent with the reauthorized Individuals with Disabilities Education Act of 2004.

References

United States education law
Education in Hawaii
Special education